Peep Sürje (19 April 1945 Rakvere – 12 May 2013 Tallinn) was an Estonian civil engineer specializing in road engineering, soil mechanics and geotechnics (mechanical compaction of soil, embankments on weak substrates).

In 1973, he graduated from Tallinn Polytechnical Institute in technical sciences (cum laude). In 1984, he graduated from the State Road Research Institute in Moscow. Since 1992, he is professor of roads' engineering.

From 2005 until 2010, he was the rector of Tallinn University of Technology and a professor emeritus of the institute in 2012.

In 2011, he was awarded with Order of the White Star, III class.

References

1945 births
2013 deaths
Estonian engineers
Tallinn University of Technology alumni
Academic staff of the Tallinn University of Technology
Commanders of the Order of the Crown (Belgium)
Recipients of the Order of the White Star, 3rd Class
People from Rakvere